Igre na skelama is a Croatian film directed by Srećko Weygand. It was released in 1961.

External links
 

1961 films
1960s Croatian-language films
Croatian drama films
1961 drama films
Yugoslav drama films